Richard A. Licht (born March 25, 1948) was the Lieutenant Governor of the U.S. state of Rhode Island from 1985 to 1989. He is a Democrat. He previously served in the Rhode Island State Senate from 1973 to 1984. He is an alumnus of Harvard Law School. His uncle, Frank Licht served as Governor of Rhode Island from 1969 to 1973.

In 2014, he was appointed as a Rhode Island Superior Court judge.

References

Lieutenant Governors of Rhode Island
Harvard Law School alumni
Democratic Party Rhode Island state senators
American people of Russian-Jewish descent
Jewish American people in Rhode Island politics
1948 births
Living people
21st-century American Jews